My Teacher's Wife is a 1995 teen sex comedy film directed by Bruce Leddy, and written by Seth Greenland. Originally titled "Bad With Numbers," the story follows the travails of Southport High School senior Todd Boomer (Jason London) whose lifelong dream of going to Harvard is derailed by his hard-nosed calculus teacher Mr. Mueller (Christopher McDonald). When Todd enlists the tutoring help of the sexy and mysterious Vicki (Tia Carrere), things go from bad to worse when it is revealed that she is married to his teacher.

The film was shot in Wilmington, NC with a planned theatrical release in February 1995. But the financial collapse of Savoy Pictures left the movie orphaned until Trimark Pictures acquired it, re-titled it as "My Teacher's Wife," and released it on DVD. It was also featured on the USA cable channel. The score was composed and performed by Kevin Gilbert, a major contributor to the Tuesday Night Music Club group which wrote songs for Sheryl Crow on her debut album. The film also features animations by Academy Award nominated cartoonist Bill Plympton.

Cast
 Jason London as Todd Boomer
 Tia Carrere as Vicky Mueller
 Christopher McDonald as Roy Mueller
 Alexondra Lee as Kirsten Beck
 Zak Orth as Paul Faber
 Jeffrey Tambor as Jack Boomer

Critics Response
The film holds a score of 48% on Rotten Tomatoes.

References

External links
 
 

1995 films
1995 comedy films
1990s sex comedy films
1990s teen comedy films
American sex comedy films
American teen comedy films
Teen sex comedy films
1990s English-language films
Films shot in North Carolina
1990s American films